Frasconi is an Italian surname. Notable people with the surname include:

Antonio Frasconi (1919–2013), Uruguayan-American artist
Miguel Frasconi (born 1956), American composer
Pablo Frasconi (born 1952), American film director

Italian-language surnames